Thomas Hanna may refer to:
 Thomas Hanna (Indiana politician), lieutenant governor of Indiana
 Thomas A. Hanna, member of the New York State Assembly
 Thomas Louis Hanna, American philosophy professor and movement theorist 
 Timz (Thomas Hanna), Iraqi-American rapper